The 2012 Cultural Olympiad was a programme of cultural events across the United Kingdom that accompanied the 2012 Summer Olympics and 2012 Summer Paralympics.

The Olympic Charter, the set of rules and guidelines for the organization of the Olympic Games and for governing the Olympic Movement states that "The LOCOG shall organise a programme of cultural events which must cover at least the entire period during which the Olympic Village is open."

London 2012 Festival
The London Olympic Games' Cultural Olympiad included 500 events nationwide throughout the UK, spread over four years and culminating in the London 2012 Festival. The cost of the events was over £97 million with funding provided by Arts Council England, Legacy Trust UK and the Olympic Lottery Distributor.

Those involved in the festival, which ran from 21 June to 9 September 2012, included Oscar-winning actress Cate Blanchett, director Mike Leigh, musician Damon Albarn, artists David Hockney, Lucian Freud, Rachel Whiteread, and writer Toni Morrison.

Twelve British artists were commissioned to design posters for the games: Martin Creed, Bridget Riley, Rachel Whiteread, Chris Ofili, Tracey Emin, Bob and Roberta Smith, Anthea Hamilton, Fiona Banner, Michael Craig-Martin, Gary Hume, Sarah Morris and Howard Hodgkin.

The Cultural Olympiad comprised a number of programmes including: Artists Taking the Lead, Discovering Places, Film Nation: Shorts, New Music 20x12, Stories of the World, World Shakespeare Festival. Many of these involved public participation; for example, Discovering Places encouraged people to explore their local environment and identify 2012 species, Film Nation was aimed at young people making short films, and Stories of the World involved young people working with 50 museums across the UK.

The Bandstand Marathon on 9 September 2012 was the closing event of the London 2012 Festival, and saw live music events take place at more than 200 locations across the UK. Participating bands were invited by Coldplay to perform their 2008 single "Viva La Vida" simultaneously at 2pm to celebrate the end of the games.

Artists taking the lead
Artists taking the lead consisted of 12 major Arts Council funded public art projects one for each of 12 UK regions. Each project received £500,000 funding.

Paralympic Cultural Festival – Unlimited
Alongside the 2012 Summer Paralympics, the Paralympic Cultural Festival (or Unlimited Festival) brought hundreds of deaf and disabled artists together, and Unlimited featured 29 new commissions, including artist Sue Austin's film documenting her performances in a self-propelled underwater wheelchair, and Paul Cummins' 'English Flower Garden'. Ticketed events were held at the Southbank Centre, as part of the London 2012 Festival, featuring the debut performance from the Paraorchestra.

The place widely regarded as an inspiration for the modern Olympic games, Much Wenlock, also featured with a May Day event called M21: From the Medieval to the 21st Century in collaboration with DASH (Disability Arts in Shropshire); artists included Simon McKeown.

The Unlimited commissions drew much mass-media and popular attention, as did the 2012 Summer Paralympics opening ceremony called Enlightenment, featuring Stephen Hawking.

New Music 20x12
New musical works commissioned from 20 composers performed around the UK and at the Southbank Centre, London. Artists included Howard Skempton, Mark-Anthony Turnage, Irene Taylor Trust, Luke Carver Goss, Joe Cutler, Graham Fitkin, Mark Prescott, David Bruce, Aidan O'Rourke, Emily Howard, Conor Mitchell, Sheema Mukherjee, Michael Wolters; Oliver Searle, Aaron Cassidy, EXAUDI, Richard Causton and Jason Yarde and Wonderbrass.

World Shakespeare Festival
Most of the programming was part of a strand titled the World Shakespeare Festival, which included translations, adaptations, and re-workings of Shakespeare's plays. Programming themed around the plays of William Shakespeare was a major part of the London 2012 Festival. It was produced by the Royal Shakespeare Company and sponsored by the Arts Council, BP and Lottery with about 60 participating organisations including the BBC, British Museum, National Theatre, the Barbican Centre, the Almeida Theatre and Shakespeare's Globe. This festival began on 23 April 2012 and finished in November 2012. It included approximately 70 productions related to Shakespeare's plays, over half of which were performed in a language other than English (particularly those which formed part of the Globe to Globe Festival at Shakespeare's Globe). Shakespeare also featured in the BBC's "Shakespeare Unlocked" 2012 season (particularly The Hollow Crown and in the 2012 Summer Olympics opening ceremony. The World Shakespeare Festival also included the Worlds Together Conference, an international interdisciplinary conference exploring the role of Shakespeare and arts learning in young people's lives. At the grass roots and with the support of the performers' union, Equity, many events occurred around the country, not least the première of a new play entitled Shakespeare's Queen Elizabeth the Second, which was also performed in Stratford-upon-Avon and open air celebration of Shakespeare in, literally, John O'Groats and many locations south. Equity-backed events also occurred in London, for young people and school children, every two months from 2010–2012.

Poetry Parnassus 
Poetry Parnassus was a week-long series of events at the Southbank Centre at the end of June, featuring poets from around the world in what has been described as "the biggest gathering of poets in world history", with one poet representing each of the 204 competing Olympic nations. Led by artist-in-residence Simon Armitage, it was a festival of readings, performance, and debate that attracted an audience of more than 13,000 people.  The opening ceremony for the event included a Rain of Poems where 100,000 English translations of the 204 poets' poems were dropped from a helicopter.

Tales from the Bridge 

Tales from the Bridge was a vast poetry soundscape (among the largest ever created) commissioned by the Mayor of London for the 2012 Cultural Olympiad.  The project was "installed for eight weeks along the entire length of the Millennium Bridge and experienced by an estimated four million people".  Collaborators for the project included Martyn Ware (The Human League) and Eric Whitacre, whose composition prefaces the piece. The flowing narrative of the main section drew on "the fascinating history of the Thames and the people, stories, life and times on both banks of the river", providing "a contemplative auditory platform that links the City of London in the north with the Southbank and vice versa".  Composed as a complex overlapping hybrid prose poem, and performed using subtle sonic textures and multiple interleaving voices, the text was conceived, written and vocally choreographed by Mario Petrucci. The project was shortlisted for the 2012 Ted Hughes Award.

See also
All The Bells
See No Evil (artwork)
La Bonche

References

TESTIMONIES. An Olympics legacy in a digital age

External links
 2012 Cultural Olympiad official website
 Unlimited, the 2012 Paralympics Cultural Festival
World Shakespeare Festival